The White Slave (French: L'esclave blanche) is a 1939 French drama film directed by Marc Sorkin and starring Viviane Romance, John Lodge and  Marcel Dalio. German director Georg Wilhelm Pabst acted as a supervisor on the production. It was shot at the Saint-Maurice Studios in Paris. The film's sets were designed by the art directors Andrej Andrejew and Guy de Gastyne, while the costumes were by Marcel Escoffier. It is a loose remake of the 1927 German silent film of the same title.

Synopsis
At the beginning of the twentieth century a Frenchwoman marries a westernised Turkish diplomat and travels with him to his homeland with romantic expectations of an Arabian Nights lifestyle.  However she is shocked on getting there by the repressive attitude towards woman. Worse her husband falls out of favour with the Sultan, who faces growing dissent from the Young Turk movement.

Cast
 Viviane Romance as Mireille
 John Lodge as Vedad Bey
 Marcel Dalio as 	Le sultan Soliman
 Sylvie as Safète - la mère de Vedad
 Mila Parély as 	Tarkine 
 Paulette Pax as 	L'amie de Safète
 Marcel Lupovici as 	Mourad 
 Roger Blin as 	Maïr 
 Odile Pascal as 	Akilé, la soeur de Mourad
 Joe Alex as 	Ali 
 Jacques Mattler as 	Un conseiller 
 Louise Carletti as Sheyla
 Saturnin Fabre as 	Djemal Pacha
 Nicolas Amato as 	Un voyageur 
 Jean Brochard as 	Le chef électricien
 Yvonne Yma as Une Turque dans le train
 Léon Larive as 	Un fonctionnaire 
 Claire Gérard as 	Une visiteuse 
 Odette Talazac as La mère de Soliman 
 Gaby André as 	Une femme du harem

References

Bibliography
 Rentschler, Eric. The Films of G.W. Pabst: An Extraterritorial Cinema. Rutgers University Press, 1990.
 Slavin, David Henry . Colonial Cinema and Imperial France, 1919–1939: White Blind Spots, Male Fantasies, Settler Myths. JHU Press, 2001.

External links 
 

1939 films
1930s French-language films
1939 drama films
French drama films
Films directed by Marc Sorkin
Remakes of German films
Films set in Paris
Films set in Istanbul
Films set in the 1900s
1930s French films